Nagendra Nath Jha (5 January 1935 – 15 June 2020) was an Indian diplomat.

Jha was born on 5 January 1935. After his graduation from Delhi University and the University of Cambridge, he joined the Foreign Service in 1957 and served as Indian ambassador to Ireland (1977-1979), to Turkey (1979–1981), to Kuwait (1984-1989), to Yugoslavia (1989-1990) and to Sri Lanka (1990-1993). Following his retirement he held the office of Lt Governor of Andaman and Nicobar Islands (2001–2004) and Lieutenant Governor of Pondicherry (2004).

References

External links 
 
 https://archive.today/20130111161543/http://www.exploreandaman.in/about-andamans.html

1935 births
2020 deaths
Ambassadors of India to Ireland
Ambassadors of India to Turkey
Ambassadors of India to Yugoslavia
Lieutenant Governors of Puducherry
Lieutenant governors of the Andaman and Nicobar Islands
Delhi University alumni
Alumni of the University of Cambridge